The MV Kansai Maru (Kanji:) was an  freighter built by Yokohama Dock Co., Yokohama, Japan, in 1930 for Harada Kisen KK. She was requisitioned by the Imperial Japanese Army as a transport in September 1941. The ship was one of the targets of the British attacks during the Battle off Endau in January 1942. Kansai Maru was sunk by the American submarine  on 19 September 1943.

References

Ships built in Japan
1930 ships
World War II merchant ships of Japan
Maritime incidents in September 1943
Ships sunk by American submarines